Lee Se-young (born December 20, 1992) is a South Korean actress. She debuted as a child actress in 1997 and was best known for her roles in Dae Jang Geum (2003), When I Turned Nine (2004), Lovely Rivals (2004), and The Wonder Years (2007). She is best known for her roles in The Gentlemen of Wolgyesu Tailor Shop (2016–2017), A Korean Odyssey (2017–2018), The Crowned Clown (2019), Doctor John (2019), Memorist (2020), Kairos (2020), The Red Sleeve (2021), and The Law Cafe (2022).

Career

Beginnings
Lee began her career as a child actress; and was best known for the films When I Turned Nine, Lovely Rivals, and The Wonder Years.

As she entered her early twenties, Lee also appeared in the television series Adolescence Medley, Missing You and Goddess of Marriage, as well as films Horror Stories 2 and Hot Young Bloods. Lee got increasingly larger roles in music romance drama Trot Lovers and fantasy mystery thriller The Vampire Detective.

2016–present: Rising popularity
Lee gained increased popularity after starring in the family drama The Gentlemen of Wolgyesu Tailor Shop (2016), where she received favourable reviews. She and co-star Hyun Woo were dubbed as The Ahchoo Couple by fans. Lee also won the Best New Actress award in the television category at the Baeksang Arts Award for her performance.

In 2017, Lee starred in her first leading role in free-to-air TV station with KBS2's youth drama Hit the Top. Lee then starred in the fantasy romantic comedy drama A Korean Odyssey by the Hong sisters, and was praised for her portrayal of three different characters.

In 2018, Lee played her first big-screen leading role in the comedy film Duck Town.

In 2019, Lee starred in the tvN historical drama The Crowned Clown, based on the 2012 Korean historical film Masquerade, where she played the role of Queen Yoo So-woon. The same year, she appeared in the horror film Lingering and the medical drama Doctor John.

In 2020, Lee starred in the mystery thriller Memorist as a genius profiler. She then reunited with Shin Sung-rok, whom she previously worked with in Trot Lovers, for the MBC drama Kairos. 

In 2021, Lee played the role of Sung Deok-im in MBC hit historical romance drama The Red Sleeve, co-starring alongside Lee Jun-ho.

In 2022, Lee made a special appearance as a cinema employee in the film Seoul Vibe. Lee also played the lead role as lawyer Kim Yu-ri in KBS romantic comedy drama The Law Cafe, reuniting with A Korean Odyssey co-star Lee Seung-gi.

In 2023, Lee will hold a fan meeting Lee Se Young Fan Meeting which will be held on April 2nd is the fan meeting event in the past 26 years time since its debut.

Filmography

Film

Television series

Web series

Television shows

Music video appearances

Awards and nominations

References

External links

 Lee Se-young at Prain TPC

20th-century South Korean actresses
21st-century South Korean actresses
South Korean film actresses
South Korean television actresses
South Korean child actresses
South Korean web series actresses
1992 births
Living people
Sungshin Women's University alumni
Best New Actress Paeksang Arts Award (television) winners